José Luis Araneda Carrasco (August 28, 1848 - January 19, 1912) was a Chilean Army officer who fought in the War of the Pacific.

1848 births
1912 deaths
Chilean Army officers
Chilean military personnel of the War of the Pacific